Xilomantzin was the tlatoani ("king") of the pre-Columbian altepetl (ethnic state) of Culhuacan in the Valley of Mexico from 1440 to 1473.

Xilomantzin was the son of Acoltzin, the previous ruler of Culhuacan, and Tlacochcuecihuatl or Tlacochcuetzin, a daughter of Tezozomoctli, ruler of Azcapotzalco. He succeeded his father in the year 13 Flint (1440). He married Izquixotzin, the daughter of Tlacateotl, ruler of Tlatelolco, and had a son named Acolmiztli.

In the year 7 House (1473), Xilomantzin sided with Moquihuixtli, then ruler of Tlatelolco, in a conflict against Tenochtitlan (led by Axayacatl), which resulted in both Moquihuixtli and Xilomantzin being killed.

Notes

References

1473 deaths
Tlatoque
Executed royalty
Year of birth unknown